Electromechanical organ can mean:

 A pipe organ with electro-pneumatic action
 An electric organ such as the Hammond organ which uses electromechanical tone generators